The  or  is a neighbourhood and hill in the historic upper town of Brussels, Belgium. This area is served by Brussels-Chapel railway station and Brussels Central Station, as well as the tram stop / (on lines 92 and 93).

History

Early history
The Sablon lies near the Mont des Arts/Kunstberg neighbourhood, and lay not far outside the first walls of Brussels. It was originally an unused open space, with areas of wetlands, grassland and sand, where a hermit made his home. Saint John's Hospital used the area as a cemetery in the 13th century, having run out of space in its own cemetery.

In 1304, the Guild of the brothers and sisters of Saint John's Hospital ceded the land to the Crossbowmen's Guild. They built a modest chapel dedicated to Our Lady on the site, completed in 1318, setting off the transformation of the area. Legend has is that the chapel became famous after a local devout woman named Beatrijs Soetkens had a vision in which the Virgin Mary instructed her to steal the miraculous statue of Onze-Lieve-Vrouw op ‘t Stocxken ("Our Lady on the little stick") in Antwerp, bring it to Brussels, and place it in the chapel of the Crossbowmen's Guild. The woman stole the statue, and through a series of miraculous events, was able to transport it to Brussels by boat in 1348. It was then solemnly placed in the chapel and venerated as the patron of the Guild. The Guild also promised to hold an annual procession, called an Ommegang, in which the statue was carried through Brussels. This Ommegang developed into an important religious and civil event in Brussels' annual calendar.

15th to 18th centuries

In the 15th century, the neighbourhood began to enlarge substantially. The chapel was rebuilt as the larger and more elegant Church of Our Blessed Lady of the Sablon, still standing today. In 1470, Duke Charles the Bold charged a body  with the creation of a street running from his nearby Coudenberg Palace to the church. The church became the site of the baptisms of princes; Archduchess Mary of Austria's baptismal cortège went to Our Blessed Lady of the Sablon instead of the Church of St. Michael and St. Gudula (now a cathedral), which had previously held the honour. Governor Margaret of Austria made it the site of her religious devotions as well. In 1530, it saw the greatest July procession in its history. These symbols of royal favour would ensure the lasting prosperity of the Sablon area. The Wolweide ("Wool meadow") area, corresponding loosely to the current /, was an extension of the Sablon, stretching to the slopes of the Galgenberg hill ("Gallows Mount"), where the current Palace of Justice stands.

In the 16th century, Brussels' most prominent noblemen established themselves on the upper Sablon and on the Rue aux Laines. The Egmonts, the Culemborgs, the Brederodes and the Mansfelds were the first, and the De Lannoys, the De Lalaings, the Thurn und Taxis, and the Solres joined them. The result was that by the 17th century, the Sablon had grown to become the most aristocratic and prosperous neighbourhood in the city. The Egmont Palace on the Petit Sablon is still standing, and gives the best indication of what the area was like at the height of its splendour; the grandiose houses of the Lannoys and the Mérode-Westerloo family still stand on the Rue aux Laines. In 1566, the Culemborg Mansion on the / was the site of the drafting of the Compromise of Nobles which ultimately led to the Dutch Revolt. To eliminate any trace of this seditious act against the king, the Duke of Alba razed the mansion to the ground in 1568.

The proximity of the cemetery was already an irritation to its aristocratic neighbours in 1554, but it would be another century and a half before the government of Brussels recognised that the situation had become unbearable. They reported that corpses "were often neglected and left in only half-covered graves, from which dogs had several times pulled parts off and run around in broad daylight with arms and legs in their mouths". It was therefore decided in 1704 to move the cemetery to the Marolles/Marollen district.

19th century to present

The Sablon neighbourhood was remodelled in the 19th century as the / was driven through the area, creating a Haussmann-esque style artery between the Royal Palace of Brussels in the Royal Quarter and the new Palace of Justice in the Marolles. The new street skirted the church, and all buildings immediately adjacent to it were demolished starting in 1872, opening up new views of the church. On that occasion, buildings not directly adjacent to the church were renovated and improved.

Though the sport is no longer played much today, it enjoyed immense popularity at the time. The Kings of the Belgians would frequently be seen among the spectators of a match; Leopold II explained that he would frequently come watch the games, as he lived in the area.

The social composition of the neighbourhood changed over the course of time. In the 19th century, it was incrementally abandoned by the aristocracy in favour of newer, more chic neighbourhoods, such as the Leopold Quarter. In the 20th century, the / was occupied by a more modest populace, characterised by small workshops and warehouses. At the end of the 1960s, the character of the area began to change yet again. Multiple antique stores moved to the area, following demolitions in the nearby Mont des Arts area. Bit by bit, the Sablon became a desirable area once again, giving rise to the neologism "sablonisation", a local version of gentrification. Recently, a number of chocolatiers and confectioners have come to the area, which is once again the heart of the Brussels upper class.

Grand Sablon

History
The / lies to the north-west of the church. When Brussels' residents mention the "Sablon" without qualification, they are usually referring to the Grand Sablon. The Grand Sablon was linked to the Petit Sablon by the / and the /, though the division between the two Sablons was accentuated by the / cutting through the area.

The place was also known as the Zavelpoel ("Sandy pond") due to a pond in the centre which would last until 1615. After the pond was filled in, a fountain was erected in its place in 1661. Water was brought to the fountain by a new conduit from Obbrussel (now Saint-Gilles). This fountain was replaced in 1754 by the present , which was a posthumous gift from the exiled British nobleman Thomas Bruce, 2nd Earl of Ailesbury, who wished to thank the people of Brussels for their hospitality. The fountain was renovated in 1999.

The Grand Sablon was often the stage for festivals and competitions, but also for tragic events. On 1 June 1568, it was the site of a mass execution, as 18 signatories of the Compromise of Nobles were decapitated.

Present day
The Grand Sablon is nowadays a genuine neighbourhood with residents and small businesses, while at the same time being a popular place to stroll and a tourist attraction. Surrounding the square are numerous antique stores, fashionable boutiques, hotels, restaurants, an auction house, and numerous pastry shops and well-known Belgian chocolatiers, including Neuhaus, Pierre Marcolini and Godiva. On Saturdays and Sundays, the Grand Sablon hosts the Sablon Antiques and Books Market.

As is the case with many other public squares in Brussels, the Grand Sablon has been partially transformed into a parking lot. A plan to refurbish the space is being investigated.

Each year, the Sablon is the starting point for the Ommegang procession. On 20 November, it hosts the beginning of the Saint-Verhaegen student parade, which celebrates the founding of the Université libre de Bruxelles (ULB) and the Vrije Universiteit Brussel (VUB) universities.

Petit Sablon

To the south-east of the church, and slightly uphill, lies the /. It is a roughly rectangular garden, featuring trees, hedges, flowers and most notably, statues.

In the Middle Ages, the Zavelbeek ("Sablon Brook") had its source in the Petit Sablon. It flowed in nearly a straight line into the Senne river, joining it roughly at the current Place Fontainas/Fontainasplein. Its course is still followed by the streets in the area to this day. The Petit Sablon was the site of Saint John Hospital's cemetery, mentioned above, until it was moved.

The present-day garden was created by the architect Henri Beyaert, and was inaugurated in 1890. It is surrounded by an ornate wrought iron fence inspired by one which once decorated the Coudenberg Palace. The fence is punctuated by tall stone pillars; atop each pillar is a statue of one or more historical professions, with 48 statues in total. To ensure that the statues were stylistically coherent, Beyaert asked the painter Xavier Mellery to design all of them, though they were executed by different sculptors. Each pillar has a unique design, as does each section of fence.

In the centre of the garden stands a fountain-sculpture by Charles-Auguste Fraikin of the Counts of Egmont and Horn, who were symbols of resistance against the Spanish tyranny that sparked the Dutch Revolt. This monument was initially in front of the King's House on the Grand-Place/Grote Markt (Brussels' main square), the site of their execution. It is surrounded by a semicircle of ten statues of 16th-century political figures, intellectuals and artists.

See also
 Neoclassical architecture in Belgium
 History of Brussels
 Belgium in "the long nineteenth century"

References

Notes

Bibliography

External links

 Official website at "Sablon, Quartier des arts et du commerce".
 Le Sablon at Ville De Bruxelles

Neighbourhoods of Brussels
Squares in Brussels
Parks in Brussels
City of Brussels